Sacha Haskell (born 30 June 1969) is an association football player who represented New Zealand at international level.

Haskell (also known as "The Enforcer") made her Football Ferns debut in a 0–1 loss to Bulgaria on 24 August 1997, and finished her international career with 16 caps and 8 goals to her credit including goals against World Cup Winners Germany.

She also was third ranked junior national representative in tennis and played representative cricket for Auckland and Wellington.

Haskell was one of the first women to be selected as a member of the special armed force unit of the New Zealand Police, the Armed Offenders Squad (AOS) from 1995 to 1999 and held the rank of detective. She featured in the television series The Line of Fire.

Club honours 
 Northern Premier Women's League champions 1987, 1991, 1999
 Auckland Premier Women's Knockout Shield winners 1987, 1991
 Auckland Premier Women's Champion-of-Champions winners 1987, 1991
 Central Premier Women's League champions 1992, 1993, 1994, 1995, 1996
 Kelly Cup winners 1994
 WSANZ Knockout Cup winners 1999

References

1969 births
Living people
New Zealand women's association footballers
New Zealand women's international footballers
Women's association footballers not categorized by position
New Zealand police officers